Lyudmila Nikolayevna Popovskaya (née Skolobanova; born 17 December 1950) is a Soviet athlete. She competed in the women's pentathlon at the 1976 Summer Olympics.

References

1950 births
Living people
Athletes (track and field) at the 1976 Summer Olympics
Soviet pentathletes
Olympic athletes of the Soviet Union
People from Ivanovo